Year 118 (CXVIII) was a common year starting on Friday (link will display the full calendar) of the Julian calendar. At the time, it was known as the Year of the Consulship of Hadrianus and Fuscus (or, less frequently, year 871 Ab urbe condita). The denomination 118 for this year has been used since the early medieval period, when the Anno Domini calendar era became the prevalent method in Europe for naming years.

Events 
 By place 

 Roman Empire 
 Trajan's Forum (commissioned by the late Emperor Trajan) is completed with triumphal arches, columns, a market complex, and an enormous basilica, all of which replace hundreds of dwellings.
 Emperor Hadrian is also a Roman Consul.
 Rome has a population exceeding 1 million, making it the largest city in the world.
 Osroene is returned to native rule by the Roman Empire.
 Plot of the consuls:  Hadrian executes four senators, all former consuls, who had been shown to have plotted against him.  His relations with the Senate are strained.
 Pantheon, in Rome, starts to be built (approximate date).
 118–128 – Battle of Centaurs and Wild Beasts, from Hadrian's Villa, Tivoli, Italy, is made (approximate date). It may be a copy of a painting done by the late 5th century BC Greek artist Zeuxis. It is now kept at Staatliche Museen zu Berlin, Preussischer Kulturbesitz, Antikensammlung.

 Asia 
 The north-south feud between the Hun Dynasty ends.
 The oldest known painted depiction of a wheelbarrow is found in a Chinese tomb of Chengde, Sichuan province, dated to this year.

Births

Deaths 
 August 8 – Primus, patriarch of Alexandria
 Aulus Cornelius Palma, Roman politician
 Bassus of Lucera, Roman bishop and martyr
 Gaius Avidius Nigrinus, Roman politician
 Lucius Publilius Celsus, Roman politician
 Lusius Quietus, Roman general and governor
 Ren Shang, Chinese general of Han Dynasty
 Terentian, Roman bishop and martyr

References